Tha Phra is a main road intersection in the Wat Tha Phra Subdistrict, Bangkok Yai District in Thon Buri side, Bangkok.

Characteristics & history
The intersection is the junction of Ratchadaphisek (Inner Ring Road) and Charan Sanit Wong Roads, include the first junction of Phet Kasem Road (Highway 4), the road to southern Thailand and the longest road in Thailand.

Around Tha Phra intersection, there is an overpass on the junction of Phet Kasem Road, and a tunnel between Ratchadapisek with Charan Sanit Wong Roads. It is considered one of the most traffic jam intersection of Thonburi side (west bank of Chao Phraya river).

The name "Tha Phra" comes from Wat Tha Phra (วัดท่าพระ) a temple located near the intersection, on the inbound side of Charan Sanit Wong Road.

Tha Phra intersection is the location of Tha Phra MRT station on the MRT Blue Line, which allows interchange between the Bang Sue–Tha Phra and Hua Lamphong–Lak Song segments of the line.

In the era before Phet Kasem Road was cut (1950), Tha Phra and vicinities are all fruit orchards and canals. The most famous fruit was Burmese grape.

It originated as a three-way junction of Phet Kasem and Charan Sanit Wong Roads, the expansion of Ratchadaphisek Road in the 1980s turned it into a four-way intersection. The overpass was completed and opened in 1991.

Surroundings
Phet Kasem side
Wiboon Business Administration College
Saiprasit Wittaya School and Saiprasit Business Administration Technological College
Naowa Chamnian Bridge
Tha Phra Rungruang Market
Wat Pradu Chimphli
Wat Pradu Chimphli School
Wat Pradu Nai Songtham
Wat Pradu Nai Songtham School
Wat Nuannoradit
Wat Nuannoradit School 
Charan Sanit Wong side
Wat Tha Phra
Tha Phra Police Station
Wat Chao Mun
Wat Chao Mun School
Siam Technological College
Sesawech Vidhaya School
Ratchadapisek side
Prasart Wittaya Anuchon School
Bangkok Yai District Office
Talat Phlu BTS Station
Talat Phlu
Ratchada-Tha Phra Hospital
The Mall Tha Phra

Transportation 
 MRT Subway: Tha Phra MRT Station
 BMTA bus: route 7 (ceased), 7ก, 42, 57, 68, 80, 80ก, 81, 84, 84ก, 89, 91ก, 101, 108, 146 (ceased), 165, 169 (ceased), 189, 710 (air cond.) 7, 80, 81, 84, 91, 147, 157, 171, 509, 542 (ceased), 547

References 

Neighbourhoods of Bangkok
Bangkok Yai district
Road junctions in Bangkok